Philip MacDonald (10 May 1904 – 4 January 1978) was a Canadian hurdler. He competed in the men's 400 metres hurdles at the 1924 Summer Olympics.

References

External links
 

1904 births
1978 deaths
Athletes (track and field) at the 1924 Summer Olympics
Canadian male hurdlers
Canadian male triple jumpers
Olympic track and field athletes of Canada
Sportspeople from Charlottetown